The 2022 Gateshead Metropolitan Borough Council election took place on 5 May 2022. One third of councillors — 22 out of 66 — on Gateshead Metropolitan Borough Council were elected. The election took place alongside other local elections across the United Kingdom.

In the previous council election in 2021, the Labour Party maintained its longstanding control of the council, holding 52 seats after the election with thirteen Liberal Democrats and one independent.

Background 

The Local Government Act 1972 created a two-tier system of metropolitan counties and districts covering Greater Manchester, Merseyside, South Yorkshire, Tyne and Wear, the West Midlands, and West Yorkshire starting in 1974. Gateshead was a district of the Tyne and Wear metropolitan county. The Local Government Act 1985 abolished the metropolitan counties, with metropolitan districts taking on most of their powers as metropolitan boroughs. 

Gateshead Council has continuously been under Labour control since its creation. The Liberal Democrats have generally been the main opposition. In the most recent election in 2021, Labour won 19 seats on 46.8% of the vote and the Liberal Democrats won 5 seats on 20.6% of the vote. The Conservatives received 22.5% of the vote and the Green Party received 8.6% of the vote, but neither party won any seats.

Positions up for election in 2022 were last election in 2018. In that election, Labour won 19 seats and the Liberal Democrats won four seats.

Electoral process 

The council elects its councillors in thirds, with a third being up for election every year for three years, with no election in the fourth year. The election will take place by first-past-the-post voting, with wards generally being represented by three councillors, with one elected in each election year to serve a four-year term.

All registered electors (British, Irish, Commonwealth and European Union citizens) living in Gateshead aged 18 or over will be entitled to vote in the election. People who live at two addresses in different councils, such as university students with different term-time and holiday addresses, are entitled to be registered for and vote in elections in both local authorities. Voting in-person at polling stations will take place from 07:00 to 22:00 on election day, and voters will be able to apply for postal votes or proxy votes in advance of the election.

Previous council composition

Results summary

Results by ward
An asterisk indicates an incumbent councillor.

Birtley

Blaydon

Bridges

Chopwell and Rowlands Gill

Chowdene

Crawcrook and Greenside

Deckham

Dunston and Teams

Dunston Hill and Whickham East

Felling

High Fell

Lamesley

Lobley Hill and Bensham

Low Fell

Pelaw and Heworth

Ryton, Crookhill and Stella

Saltwell

Wardley and Leam Lane

Whickham North

Whickham South and Sunniside

Windy Nook and Whitehills

Winlaton and High Spen

References 

Gateshead Council elections
Gateshead